Phil Healey is a rugby union strength and conditioning coach with the Blues in Auckland, having previously been with Glasgow Warriors. He joined the Glasgow side for the 2017–18 season. Before he was with Glasgow he was previously a strength and conditioning coach for the Chiefs in New Zealand.

Rugby union coaching career
Healey was the head strength and conditioning coach for Counties Manukau Rugby Football Union from 2003 until 2008.

He then joined the Chiefs in 2008 and stayed there until 2017. In 2016 the Chief's Head Coach, Dave Rennie, credited part of the team's success to the strength and conditioning work by Healey and his team. During Healey's time at the Chief's Waikato University's Sport and Leisure Studies students worked as interns with him.

He joined Glasgow Warriors for the 2017–18 season along with Dave Rennie.

On 23 October 2018 it was announced that Healey would leave Glasgow Warriors for personal reasons to return home to New Zealand. He will take up a position with The Blues in Auckland.

References

External links
Phil Healey of The Chiefs discusses STATSports Viper
Conditioning key to Chiefs success

Living people
Glasgow Warriors coaches
People educated at Pukekohe High School
Rugby union strength and conditioning coaches
Sportspeople from Hamilton, New Zealand
Year of birth missing (living people)